Santo Araniti (born April 25, 1947 in Reggio Calabria) is an Italian criminal and a member of the 'Ndrangheta, a Mafia-type criminal organisation in Calabria. He was a fugitive since 1983 and included in the list of most wanted fugitives in Italy until his capture in May 1994.

Criminal career
He started his criminal career as an associate of Domenico Tripodo – the boss the city of Reggio Calabria and the surrounding areas. He became a member of La Santa in the 1970s. He was a key ally of the De Stefano brothers, in the war against their former boss Tripodo in the mid 1970s. In 1985, at the start of the Second 'Ndrangheta war between the De Stefano and the Serraino, Condello and Imerti clans, he chose the side of the Condello-Imerti alliance. The bloody six-year war clan left 621 deaths.

In 1990, he was sentenced to nine years for international drug trafficking. Later he received a life sentence for ordering the killing in 1989 of Lodovico Ligato, a former head of the Italian state railways.

Number one
For a while, he was considered to be the "number one" of the 'Ndrangheta and the head of Camera di Controllo, a provincial commission of the 'Ndrangheta, that had been created as the result of negotiations to end years of inter family violence.

On May 24, 1994, police arrested him in Rome. He was incarcerated under the harsh article 41-bis prison regime. In November 2008 he was released from the harsh regime but remained in prison.

References

1947 births
Fugitives
Fugitives wanted by Italy
Living people
'Ndranghetisti
'Ndranghetisti sentenced to life imprisonment
People from Reggio Calabria